C. David Cerullo (born October 23, 1952, in Newburgh, New York)
is an American Pentecostal minister and televangelist who promotes prosperity theology. Chairman and CEO of The Inspiration Networks, Cerullo is also an entrepreneur and businessman.

Early life and education
The son of international evangelist Morris Cerullo, Cerullo is a graduate of Oral Roberts University with a degree in business administration.

Ministry

The Inspiration Networks
Under Cerullo's leadership, The Inspiration Networks, which includes INSP, Inspiration Network International (INI), and La Familia Cosmovision, a Spanish-language network for Hispanic families, the combined viewership has reached more than 150 million households across the globe.

The flagship network INSP carries a variety of programming, ranging from ministry programming to such wholesome family classics as The Waltons, Little House on the Prairie, The Virginian, Bonanza, Daniel Boone, and The High Chaparral.

Cerullo's Inspiration Network compensation in 2012 was nearly $1.7 million, with his wife and two children additionally receiving more than $100,000 each, according to a 2013 report by the Chronicle of Philanthropy.

Inspiration Campmeeting
INSP periodically airs revival specials, known as Inspiration Campmeeting, which also feature evangelists such as Mike Murdock and George Bloomer, and Christian recording artists such as Judy Jacobs, Sandi Patti and Larnelle Harris. Ministry Contributions and prayer requests can also be made during the airing of these specials.

Entrepreneur and businessman
In addition to organizing international business projects, Cerullo founded an advertising and public relations firm, a management consulting firm, and a real estate company that developed and constructed hotels, commercial office buildings, single-family home subdivisions, apartments and retail.

Criticism
Cerullo and family have received criticism due to building a $4 million gated-community home on Lake Keowee in South Carolina. Boasting 9,000 square feet, and one of the most expensive homes in the area, the purchase brought concern from viewers who donated money to the organization.

The home, with 4 bedrooms and 5 full and 3 half baths and located on 1.12 acres at 138 Blue Water Trail, Salem, SC 29676, was subsequently listed for resale on Realtor.com beginning on February 16, 2013, for $5.95 million and then after delistings and relistings on March 23, 2015, (MLS 20152389) for $4.95 million.

Cerullo's Inspiration Network compensation in 2012 was nearly $1.7 million, with his wife and two children additionally receiving more than $100,000 each, according to a 2013 report by the Chronicle of Philanthropy.

Personal and family
Cerullo and his wife, Barbara have been married for 42 years, and have two adult children, evangelist Ben Cerullo and Becky Cerullo-Henderson and five grandchildren. Together, David and Barbara Cerullo host the daily national television series, Inspiration Today.

References

External links
 , Cerullo's official website

1952 births
20th-century American businesspeople
20th-century religious leaders
21st-century American businesspeople
21st-century religious leaders
American chairpersons of corporations
American chief executives in the media industry
American Pentecostals
American television company founders
American television evangelists
American people of Italian descent
American people of Russian-Jewish descent
 Businesspeople from South Carolina
Christians from North Carolina
Christians from South Carolina
Living people
Male television personalities
Oral Roberts University alumni
Pentecostal religious workers
People from New Jersey
People from Newburgh, New York
Prosperity theologians
Television personalities from South Carolina